Homogyne alpina, the Alpine coltsfoot or purple colt's-foot, is a rhizomatous herb in the family Asteraceae, which is often used as an ornamental plant. In addition, this plant has purple-red flowers, and it is usually associated with the gall flies Ensina sonchi and Acidia cognata.

Homogyne alpina is a perennial plant that reaches a height of 10 to 40 centimeters. The rhizome is creeping woolly and scaly. The stem is erect, reddish brown and often single head. It is hairy silvery-woolly, bare later and usually has 2 leaves on small scales. The leaves are basal, long-stalked, leathery, coarse and glossy dark green, the underside is lighter. The leaf blade is heart-kidney-shaped.

The baskets have a diameter up to 25 mm. The bracts are single row, crowded and hairy brown-red woolly at the base. The flowers are reddish and longer than the basket case, the corners are purple. The fruits have a long hair crown.

Flowering time is from May to August.

Occurrence

Homogyne alpina comes in the mountains of South Central Europe at altitudes from 500 to 3 000 meters. The species grows on moist, humus-rich, mossy soil in coniferous forests, bushes and dwarf-shrub heath. It is common in the U.K., known from a single location in Angus, Scotland, though it is uncertain whether the plant is native or introduced.

Similar species

The felt-like Homogyne discolor is characterized by the under side white, felty leaves.

References

 
 Xavier Finkenzeller, Jürke Gray: Alpine Flowers (Steinbach nature guide). Mosaic Verlag, Munich 1996, .

External links
Homogyne alpina

Senecioneae
Plants described in 1753
Taxa named by Carl Linnaeus
Flora of the Alps